Walter Henry Housman III (born October 13, 1962) is a former American football offensive tackle who played one season with the New Orleans Saints of the National Football League (NFL). Housman served as an assistant coach for the Baltimore Brigade of the Arena Football League (AFL) from 2017–2019. He first enrolled at the University of Iowa before transferring to Upsala College. He attended Merrimack High School in Merrimack, New Hampshire. Housman was also a member of the New York Knights, Denver Dynamite and New Orleans Night of the Arena Football League (AFL).

College career
Housman first played college football for the Iowa Hawkeyes for two years before injuring his knee.

He transferred to play for the Upsala Vikings of Upsala College for three years, graduating in 1987 with a Bachelor's of Science in Business Administration. He also played basketball for one year.

Professional career
Housman played in three games for the New Orleans Saints of the NFL in 1987. He played for the New York Knights of the AFL in 1988. He played for the AFL's Denver Dynamite from 1989 to 1990. Housman played for the New Orleans Night of the AFL in 1991.

Coaching career
Housman was an assistant coach for the Upsala Vikings in 1988. He served as a volunteer assistant coach for the Tulane Green Wave in 1991. He was defensive line for the South Dakota Coyotes from 1992 to 1996. Housman was also special teams coach of the Coyotes from 1994 to 1996 and later served as defensive coordinator and inside linebackers coach from 1997 to 1998. He served as defensive line coach of the Central Connecticut Blue Devils in 1999. He was linebackers coach of the Saint Anselm Hawks of Saint Anselm College in 2000. Housman served as defensive coordinator of the AFL's Chicago Rush from 2001 to 2008. He also had previous coaching experience in the AFL with the New England Sea Wolves, Miami Hooters and New Orleans Night. He was a volunteer assistant and defensive ends coach for the Holy Cross Crusaders of the College of the Holy Cross in 2009. Housman later served as defensive line coach of the Crusaders in 2010. He served as defensive coordinator and assistant head coach of the Chicago Rush from 2011 to 2013. He was the defensive coordinator and assistant head coach of the Los Angeles Kiss of the AFL from 2014 to 2016. On March 7, 2017, Housman was named the defensive coordinator and assistant head coach for the Baltimore Brigade. In 2018, Cedric Walker became the Brigade's new defensive coordinator and Housman remained the assistant head coach.

References

External links
Just Sports Stats

Living people
1962 births
Players of American football from Missouri
American football offensive tackles
American football offensive guards
Iowa Hawkeyes football players
Upsala Vikings football players
Upsala Vikings men's basketball players
New Orleans Saints players
New York Knights (arena football) players
Denver Dynamite (arena football) players
New Orleans Night players
Tulane Green Wave football coaches
South Dakota Coyotes football coaches
Central Connecticut Blue Devils football coaches
Saint Anselm Hawks football coaches
Chicago Rush coaches
Holy Cross Crusaders football coaches
Los Angeles Kiss coaches
Baltimore Brigade coaches
People from Marshall, Missouri
American men's basketball players
National Football League replacement players